Jean Dubreuil, also known as Jean Du Breuil (22 July 1602 – 27 April 1670), was a French mathematician, music theorist, writer and essayist.

Life 

Son of the bookseller Claude Du Breuil, he continued his father's profession until he joined the Society of Jesus. He lived for a long time in Rome where he studied architecture. 
He is known for his work about the theory and practice of perspective.

Works 
 
 
 La perspective practique, 1642–1649
 L'Art universel des fortifications

References 

French mathematicians
1602 births
1670 deaths
French essayists
French writers